The Beijing Star Daily or Beijing Entertainment Post, also known as Beijing Daily Messenger or Beijing Entertainment Newspaper, was a comprehensive entertainment newspaper published in Beijing. 

Beijing Star Daily was formerly known as Drama and Film Post (戏剧电影报), which was founded by the Beijing Federation of Literary and Art Circles (北京市文学艺术联合会) on January 4, 1981.  On January 1, 2018, the paper officially ceased publication.

History
Beijing Star Daily was renamed from Drama and Film Post,  which was launched on January 4, 1981. 

On October 9, 2000,  the Drama and Film Post officially changed its name to Beijing Star Daily.  In November 2004, it was taken over by the Beijing Daily Newspaper Group (北京日报报业集团).

On November 27, 2007, the newspaper was transformed into a metro newspaper,  which was distributed free of charge in Beijing's subway stations.

In January 2010, Beijing authority banned the sale of newspapers other than the Beijing Star Daily in subway stations. The ban sparked a strong backlash in Chinese media circles, with The Beijing News and the Beijing Times publishing articles expressing their displeasure.  

On January 1, 2018, the Beijing Star Daily officially ceased publication.

References

Defunct newspapers published in China
Newspapers published in Beijing
Newspapers established in 1981
Publications disestablished in 2018